The 2020 FIBA Men's Olympic Qualifying Tournaments were the four basketball tournaments that were contested by 23 national teams, where the top teams earned a place in the 2020 Summer Olympics basketball tournament. They were originally scheduled to take place from 23 to 28 June 2020 but were postponed due to the COVID-19 pandemic, to 29 June to 4 July 2021.

Hosts selection
The cities of Victoria, Split, Kaunas and Belgrade hosted the tournaments.

Format
There were four qualifying tournaments, each producing a team which was qualified for the 2020 Summer Olympics. The format consisted of 24 national teams divided into four tournaments of six teams each, with the winning team from each event qualifying for the Olympics.

Teams
The FIBA Olympic Qualifying Tournaments included the 16 best-placed non-qualified teams from the 2019 FIBA Basketball World Cup and two highest-ranked countries per region in the FIBA World Ranking. On 19 September 2019, FIBA announced those teams, which are Angola and Senegal (Africa), Mexico and Uruguay (Americas), China and Korea (Asia-Oceania), and Croatia and Slovenia (Europe).

New Zealand initially qualified for the Olympic Qualifying Tournament by virtue of the 2019 FIBA Basketball World Cup. On 26 February 2021, Basketball New Zealand announced that they would pull out of the tournament. On the same day, FIBA announced that they would be replaced by the Philippines as the next-best team from the Asia-Oceania region in FIBA World Rankings.

Senegal had been initially included in the Belgrade Tournament, but it was forced to withdraw before the start due to several COVID-19 positive cases, and not being replaced by any team, lowering the number of participants to 23.

Draw
The draw for the Olympic qualifiers took place at The House of Basketball in Mies, Switzerland on 27 November 2019.

Seeding
The latest ranking before the draw served as the basis to determine the pots for the draw (seeding in brackets). In each tournament, group A consists of one team each from pots 1, 4 and 5, while group B consists of one team each from pots 2, 3 and 6.

Squads

Qualifying tournaments

Victoria

Preliminary round

Group A

Group B

Final round

Final ranking

Split

Preliminary round

Group A

Group B

Final round

Final ranking

Kaunas

Preliminary round

Group A

Group B

Final round

Final ranking

Belgrade

Preliminary round

Group A

Group B
FIBA did not publish any standings. Both teams qualified to the final round, with the winner playing Group A's runner-up.

|}

Final round

Final ranking

See also
Basketball at the 2020 Summer Olympics
2020 FIBA Women's Olympic Qualifying Tournaments

References

Basketball at the Summer Olympics – Men's qualification
Basketball at the 2020 Summer Olympics – Men's qualification
Qual
2021 in basketball
2019–20 in Canadian basketball
International basketball competitions hosted by Canada
Sports competitions in Victoria, British Columbia
2019–20 in Croatian basketball
International basketball competitions hosted by Croatia
Sports competitions in Split, Croatia
2020–21 in Serbian basketball
International basketball competitions hosted by Serbia
International sports competitions in Belgrade
2019–20 in Lithuanian basketball
International basketball competitions hosted by Lithuania
Sports competitions in Kaunas
basketball
FIBA
FIBA
FIBA
FIBA
Impact of the COVID-19 pandemic on the 2020 Summer Olympics